Noctubourgognea glottuloides is a moth of the family Noctuidae. It is found in Valparaíso in Chile.

The wingspan is 39–41 mm. Adults are on wing from January to March.

External links
 Noctuinae of Chile

Noctuinae
Endemic fauna of Chile